Seán McCarthy (1 January 1937 – 12 July 2021) was an Irish Fianna Fáil politician. A medical doctor before entering politics, he was first elected to Dáil Éireann as a Fianna Fáil Teachta Dála (TD) for the Tipperary South constituency at the 1981 general election. He was re-elected at each subsequent election until he lost his seat at the 1989 general election. 

He was elected to Seanad Éireann by the Agricultural Panel in the following Seanad election. He unsuccessfully contested both the 1992 general election and the subsequent Seanad election. He served as Minister of State at the Department of Industry and Commerce from 1987 to 1989 with responsibility for Science and Technology.

McCarthy was a member of South Tipperary County Council for the Cashel electoral area, and also a member of Cashel Town Council from 1999 to 2014.

He died on 12 July 2021.

References

1937 births
2021 deaths
Fianna Fáil senators
Fianna Fáil TDs
Irish sportsperson-politicians
Members of the 22nd Dáil
Members of the 23rd Dáil
Members of the 24th Dáil
Members of the 25th Dáil
Members of the 19th Seanad
Ministers of State of the 25th Dáil
Local councillors in South Tipperary
People educated at Rockwell College
Politicians from County Tipperary
20th-century Irish medical doctors